Boca Reservoir  is an artificial lake in Nevada County, California, United States, located in the perimeter covered by Tahoe National Forest. It was created by the construction of Boca Dam across Little Truckee River, approximately  10 km northeast of Truckee. It is located downstream (south) of Stampede Dam and to the east of Prosser Creek Dam and Prosser Creek Reservoir.

See also
List of dams and reservoirs in California
List of lakes in California

References

External links
 
 Boca Dam — at Noehill Travels in California.

Reservoirs in Nevada County, California
Tahoe National Forest
Reservoirs in California
Reservoirs in Northern California